Dobra devojka is the eighth studio album by Serbian singer Dragana Mirković. It was released in 1991.

An updated version of the song "Umreću zbog tebe" is featured on Dragana's twentieth studio album, 20, released in 2012.

Track listing
Volim te, voliš me
Kaži mi sunce moje
Dobra devojka
Što te nema
Hajdemo negde
Poklanjam ti svoju ljubav (featuring Đogani)
Umreću zbog tebe
Svud si oko mene
Bog srca mog
Dodaj gas

References

1991 albums
Dragana Mirković albums